Warby may refer to:

 Ed Warby (born 1968), Dutch musician
 Ken Warby (born 1939), Australian motorboat racer
 Mark Warby (born 1958), judge of the High Court of England and Wales
 nickname of Adrian Warburton (1918–1944), Second World War Royal Air Force flying ace

See also 
 
 Clavy-Warby, a commune in the Ardennes department in northern France
 Warby–Chiltern Box–Ironbark Region, a cluster of separate blocks of remnant box-ironbark forest habitat in Victoria, Australia
 Warby-Ovens National Park, a national park located in the Hume region of Victoria, Australia
 Warby Range State Park, a former state park in Victoria, Australia, since 2010 a part of Warby-Ovens National Park
 Warby Parker, an American brand of prescription eyeglasses and sunglasses founded in 2010